The Asch Recordings, recorded between 1944 and 1949, are a series of albums featuring some of the most famous recordings of US folk musician Woody Guthrie. The recordings were recorded by Moses "Moe" Asch in New York City. The songs recorded by Asch comprise the bulk of Guthrie's original material and several traditional songs. They were issued on a variety of labels over the years under the labels Asch, Asch-Stinson, Asch-Signature-Stinson, Disc, Folkways and Smithsonian Folkways. The tracks for Guthrie's Songs to Grow on for Mother and Child and Nursery Days were from these sessions.

Folkways release 
The Smithsonian Folkways label repackaged and arranged these sessions in a series of 4 discs between 1997 and 1999; this is the most current release of these recordings.

Recording detail

 Note: A blank cell below a date indicates that the date is repeated on that row.

Many recordings have unknown session dates. These are included in a list available at the United States Library of Congress titled "Surviving Recordings in the Smithsonian Folklife Archive Made by Woody Guthrie for Moses Asch". Moe Asch says Woody's kids songs were recorded sometime in early 1947 and the Sacco and Vanzetti ballads were recorded January 1947.

References 

Woody Guthrie albums
1997 compilation albums
1998 compilation albums
1999 compilation albums